Bima Sakti Tukiman (born 23 January 1976) is a retired Indonesian footballer and current head coach of the Indonesia U16 football team. He was named after the galaxy Milky Way, called "Bima Sakti" in Indonesian language.

Club career 
During his playing career, Bima played for PKT Bontang, Pelita Jaya, PSM Makassar, PSPS Pekanbaru, Persema Malang, Persepar Palangkaraya, Mitra Kukar, Gresik United and Persiba Balikpapan before his retirement in 2016.

International career 
His debut for the senior national team happened on 4 December 1995 at the age of 19. He was a member of PSSI Primavera Program in mid 1990s. As of 2012, his national caps total just short of Kurniawan Dwi Yulianto's (Kurniawan's 60 to Bima's 56 caps).

Managerial Statistics

As a manager

Honours

Player
PSM Makassar
 Liga Indonesia Premier Division: 1999–2000

Perseba Bangkalan
 Liga Indonesia Third Division: 2013

Indonesia
 Southeast Asian Games Silver Medal (1): 1997

Manager
Indonesia U-16
 AFF U-16 Youth Championship
 Third Place : 2019
 Champions : 2022

References

External links 
 
 

1976 births
Living people
Sportspeople from East Kalimantan
People from Balikpapan
Indonesian footballers
Indonesia international footballers
1996 AFC Asian Cup players
2000 AFC Asian Cup players
Persiba Balikpapan players
Persema Malang players
PKT Bontang players
Pelita Jaya FC players
PSM Makassar players
gresik United players
PSPS Pekanbaru players
Mitra Kukar players
Liga 1 (Indonesia) players
Association football midfielders
Southeast Asian Games bronze medalists for Indonesia
Southeast Asian Games medalists in football
Competitors at the 1997 Southeast Asian Games